Chalcidica minea is a moth in the family Cossidae. It is found in India, Vietnam, Thailand, the Moluccas, Papua New Guinea, Queensland and on the Solomon Islands. The habitat consists of lowland rainforests.

Adults have red wings with blue-black patches.

References

 , 2004: Cossidae of Thailand. Part 1. (Lepidoptera: Cossidae). Atalanta 35 (3-4): 335-351.
 , 2009: The Carpenter Moths (Lepidoptera:Cossidae) of Vietnam. Entomofauna Supplement 16: 11-32.
Natural History Museum Lepidoptera generic names catalog

Zeuzerinae
Moths described in 1779